Nuyorican Productions, Inc. is an American production company founded by Jennifer Lopez and Benny Medina.

History 
Lopez owns the film and television production company Nuyorican Productions, which was launched as early as 2001. It was co-founded with her manager Benny Medina, who was supposed to receive half the producing revenue from the company. Lopez split with Medina shortly after the company was founded.
In September 2003, Nuyorican Productions partnered with HBO to create a documentary about Los Quinces, a traditional ball held to celebrate a Cuban girl's 15th birthday. In 2004, her production company was signed with Fox and Regency Television.

Nuyorican Productions produced South Beach, a primetime television drama that aired from January 6 to February 11, 2006 on UPN. The series, which stars Vanessa L. Williams, follows three young adults "trying to get ahead in Miami". The show experienced low ratings and received generally negative reviews from critics. With UPN shutting down and moving its programming to The CW that fall, South Beach was one of many shows that weren't moved over to the new network. Screenwriter Jack Bunick filed a lawsuit in April stating that the plot for South Beach was copied from South Beach Miami, a script he wrote in 1999. Bunick alleged he pitched the idea to UPN, but was never contacted back. The lawsuit named Lopez, UPN, CBS Television and others as defendants. It was dropped in April 2008 by U.S. District Judge Richard Berman, who stated that there's inadequate evidence to take the case to trial.

El Cantante, a film in which Lopez starred alongside then-husband Marc Anthony, was Nuyorican Production's first production. Nuyorican Productions produced the Univisión miniseries Como Ama una Mujer, named after her album of that title. It ran five episodes from October 30 to November 27, 2007, and starred Adriana Cruz. Another show that came from her production company, Brethren which Fox gave script commitment, and it later aired on the channel. 
In November 2011, it was announced that Nuyorican Productions will produce Where in the World Is Carmen Sandiego?, a film adaption of the educational children's game. In 2012, it was announced Lopez is producing a drama series called The Fosters for the cable network Freeform. In 2008, the company signed a deal with Universal Media Studios.

In January 2019, Alex Brown was hired as production executive, serving as a producer on all upcoming projects for the company. In August 2019, Catherine Hagedorn joined the company as head of development. More recently, the company signed a deal with Netflix.

Logo 

The company's logo is a replica of the Empire State Building with a coconut tree near it.

Filmography

Films

Television series

Television specials
 Jennifer Lopez in Concert (2001)
 Jennifer Lopez: Dance Again (2014)
 Neighborhood Sessions: Jennifer Lopez (2015)

Online series
 Tiger Beat Entertainment (2012)

Discography
"Booty" (2014)
"Olvídame y Pega la Vuelta" (2016)
"Chegaste" (2016)
"Ni Tú Ni Yo" (2017)
"Amor, Amor, Amor" (2017)
"El Anillo" (2018)
"Medicine" (2019)
"In the Morning" (2020)
"Cambia el Paso" (2021)
"This Is Me...Now" (2023)

References 

Entertainment companies based in California
Entertainment companies established in 2001
Jennifer Lopez
Companies based in Los Angeles
Television production companies of the United States